Linyovo Ozero is a village (selo) in the central part of Khiloksky District of Zabaykalsky Krai, Russia, located on the Bludnaya River.  Population: 2,655 (2002).

It was founded in 1927 as a logging post for railway network's needs and in the course of decades it has become a highly developed logging industry center.

References
Encyclopedia of Transbaikal.  Entry on Linyovo Ozero

Rural localities in Zabaykalsky Krai